Cheruvu Madhavaram is a big village in G. Konduru mandal. It has largest population. It is famous for quarrying works at nearby rocky hills. The Gram Panchayat for nearby Munagapadu village is clubbed with this village panchayat. It falls under Vijayawada Railway division of South Central Railway.

External links
  Cheruvu Madhavaram official site

Villages in NTR district